Lajos Pósa (9 April 1850 – 9 July 1914) was a Hungarian writer and poet. He created and edited a children's literary journal.

Hungarian writers
1850 births
1914 deaths